Eve-Mai Maurer (née Uusmees; born 27 December 1936) is an Estonian former breaststroke swimmer who won a silver medal in the 4×100 m medley relay at the 1958 European Aquatics Championships. She also competed at the 1960 Summer Olympics in the 200 m breaststroke but was eliminated in the preliminaries.

Maurer started training in gymnastics but around 1952 switched to swimming. Her name is usually given as Eve Uusmees, but she changed it to Maurer 1959. During 1953–64 she competed for Estonian team and during 1956–62 for the Soviet Union team. She won five USSR titles: 100 m breaststroke (1960), 200 m breaststroke (1958–60) and 4×100 m medley (1958); in 1962 she finished second in the 100 m, and in 1956–57 she was third in the 200 m breaststroke.  After retirement she worked as a swimming coach and administrator.

References

1936 births
Living people
Estonian female breaststroke swimmers
Olympic swimmers of the Soviet Union
Swimmers at the 1960 Summer Olympics
Soviet female breaststroke swimmers
European Aquatics Championships medalists in swimming
Swimmers from Tallinn
Estonian swimming coaches